"Where I Belong" is a song by Australian singer Sia. It was released as the third single from her 2004 album, Colour the Small One in August 2004.

"Where I Belong" was scheduled to be included on the soundtrack for the film Spider-Man 2; however, owing to a record label conflict, it was withdrawn at the last minute. This is referenced in the cover art for the single, which features Sia donning a Spider-Man costume.

Promotion
Sia performed the track on her four UK live summer appearance in 2004:
 1 July - Lock 17
 1 August - Big Chill
 4 August - Supporting Air at Somerset House 
 15 August - Weekender Summer Sundae, Leicester.

Review
In an album review, Daniel Murt of The Guardian listed "Where I Belong" as a stand out tracks alongside "Don't Bring Me Down".

Charts
On 21 August 2004, The song debuted at number 85 on the UK Singles Charts and stayed in the Top 100 for 1 week.

Track listings
 1 track Single
 Where I Belong (Radio Edit) - 4:44

 CD Maxi
 Where I Belong - 4:45
 Where I Belong (Roni Size Remix) - 5:58
 Where I Belong (Red Astaire Remix) - 6:06
 Where I Belong (Wookie Remix) - 4:35
 Where I Belong (Hot Chip Remix) - 5:06
 Where I Belong (Future Funk Squad Acidic Funk Dub) - 5:52
 Where I Belong (Roni Size Crush Remix) - 5:32

 2008 US Remix 1
 Where I Belong (Roni Size Remix) - 6:03
 Where I Belong (Roni Size Crush Remix) - 5:34

 2008 US Remix 2 
 Where I Belong (Red Astaire Remix) - 6:11
 Where I Belong (Future Funk Squad "Acidic-Funk" Dub) - 5:55

Credits and Personnel
 Design, Art Direction – Blue Source
 Drums – Jeremy Stacey
 Engineer – Cameron Craig
 Engineer [Assistant] – Patrick Moore
 Guitar [Electric Guitar] – Kevin Cormack
 Keyboards, Horns – Martin Slattery
 Saxophone, Background Vocals – Camille
 Lyrics By [Words], Vocals, Written-by – Sia Furler
 Mastered By – Frank Arkwright
 Mixed By – Tchad Blake
 Photography By [Cover Photography] – Gareth McConnell
 Producer, Acoustic Guitar [Acoustic Guitars], Percussion – Jimmy Hogarth
 Written-by, Bass [Bass Guitar] – Samuel Dixon

Release history

References

2004 singles
2004 songs
Sia (musician) songs
Songs written by Samuel Dixon
Songs written by Sia (musician)
Astralwerks singles
Go! Beat singles
Downtempo songs